Luzhsky (masculine), Luzhskaya (feminine), or Luzhskoye (neuter) may refer to:
Luzhsky District, a district of Leningrad Oblast
Luga Okrug (Luzhsky okrug) (1927–1930), former administrative division of Leningrad Oblast, Russia
Luzhsky Uyezd, an administrative division of St. Petersburg Governorate in the Russian Empire
Luzhskoye Urban Settlement, a municipal formation corresponding to Luzhskoye Settlement Municipal Formation, an administrative division of Luzhsky District of Leningrad Oblast, Russia